Marre is a surname which may refer to:

Sir Alan Marre (1914–1990), British civil servant
Albert Marre (1924–2012), American stage director and producer
Hap Marre (early 20th century), American soccer player
Jeremy Marre (1943–2020), British television director
John Marre (early 20th century), American soccer player, team owner and executive
Yves Marre, French entrepreneur, inventor and adventurer

See also
Mar (disambiguation)
Marr (disambiguation)